John Mulligan was a Major League Baseball third baseman who played in one game on June 14, 1884 for the Washington Nationals of the Union Association. He finished the game with a .250 batting average and a .250 at bat average.

References

External links

Major League Baseball third basemen
Baseball players from Pennsylvania
19th-century baseball players
Washington Nationals (UA) players
Year of death missing
Year of birth missing